Sociedad Deportiva Amorebieta is a Spanish football team based in Amorebieta-Etxano, in the Basque Country. Founded in 1925, it currently plays in Primera División RFEF – Group 2, holding home games at Campo Municipal de Urritxe, which seats 3,000 spectators (1,300 seated).

History
Amorebieta was founded in 1925 after the dissolution of Sociedad Deportiva Beti-Arin (founded on 2 December 1923). The Zornotzarra club, alongside 21 other clubs in Biscay, joined the Biscayan Football Federation.

In the 1926–27 season, the club made an outstanding campaign in its second competitive year. It had as its main rival FBC Durango, who finished in the top position after a tiebreaker match, after both teams totalled 14 points in the season. Despite finishing second, Amorebieta clinched the first promotion of its history, rising one step inside the Biscayan Regional category to play, the next year, in the Preferente C division.

In 1962–63, Amorebieta played in the semi-finals of the Spanish Amateur Championship against Real Madrid's farm team, losing 0–2 in Vallecas and managing a 2–2 draw in the second leg, thus being eliminated.

Eighteen years later, the team finished second in Preferente, and played in a promotion play-off against Mondragón CF, which won 4–3 in the first leg; however, a 2–0 home triumph in the second match promoted, for the second time in its history, the club to the fourth division, where it remained for the following three decades.

On 29 May 2011, Amorebieta was promoted for the first time to Segunda División B after beating CD Manacor in the 2011 Tercera División play-offs. In its first season in the third tier, the club finished in the fourth position in Group 2 and qualified for the promotion play-offs, but was eliminated in the first round by Balompédica Linense. In the 2017–18 season Amorebieta finished in the 14th position in Segunda División B, Group 2. The following 2018–19 campaign was more successful, as the club finished eighth.

On 22 May 2021, Amorebieta was promoted to the Segunda División for the first time ever by defeating Badajoz in the final round of the promotion play-offs. Immediately they faced their first problem of where to play, as their basic Urritxe ground did not meet requirements by several measures and would be prohibitive to upgrade, and none of the possible options, including Ipurua in Eibar and Lezama outside Bilbao, was an ideal solution.  On 17 June, the club reached an agreement with Athletic for the utilisation of Lezama's ground 2, after it was approved by the LFP. On 21 May 2022, Amorebieta was relegated back to the third tier after only one season in second tier.

Season to season

1 season in Segunda División
1 season in Primera División RFEF
10 seasons in Segunda División B
36 seasons in Tercera División

Current squad
.

Current technical staff

Honours & achievements
Promotion to Segunda División: 2020–21
Tercera División:  2010–11
Promotion to Preferente C: 1926–27
Promotion to Tercera División: 1961–62, 1980–81

Former players

Perhap's Amorebieta's most successful former player is Xabier Etxeita, who began his career at his hometown club before moving on to Athletic Bilbao, where he was a winner of the 2015 Supercopa de España and was capped by Spain. Amorebieta have close ties with Athletic, and several players have appeared for both clubs.

Reserve team
Amorebieta's reserve team, SD Amorebieta B, was founded in 2003 and plays in the Primera División de Vizcaya, which corresponds to the sixth division. In September 2021, a second reserve team called SD Amorebieta C was incorporated into the club's structure.

References

External links
Official website 
Futbolme team profile 
Estadios de España 

Football clubs in the Basque Country (autonomous community)
Association football clubs established in 1925
1925 establishments in Spain
Sport in Biscay
SD Amorebieta
Segunda División clubs
Primera Federación clubs
Football clubs in Spain